Emmanuel Duah (born 14 November 1976) is a Ghanaian former professional footballer who played as a winger.

Club career
Duah was born in Kumasi, Ghana. After his exploits at the 1991 FIFA U-17 World Championship, 15-year-old Duah was bought by Serie A club Torino FC, alongside teammates Mark Edusei, Mohammed Gargo and Samuel Kuffour. He never appeared officially for the Italians, and also had a very difficult time at his following team, Standard Liège in Belgium.

After two years in Turkey with as many clubs, Duah joined RCD Mallorca in the Spanish second division, being sparingly used as the Balearic Islands side promoted to La Liga. His next stop – also in the second level – would be his most productive and steady, as he played five years with U.D. Leiria from Portugal, also attaining promotion in his debut season with a career-best 11 goals in only 18 games.

Duah was used regularly by Leiria in the following Primeira Liga campaigns, but only appeared in ten matches in 2001–02 (three goals) as the José Mourinho-led team qualified to the UEFA Intertoto Cup after finishing seventh. Subsequently, released he continued in the country, playing two seasons with Gil Vicente F.C. also in the top flight.

Duah closed out his career in 2008 at nearly 32, after two-year spells in Lebanon and Israel with Nejmeh and Hapoel Acre, respectively.

International career
Duah was a member of Ghana's under-17 team that won the 1991 FIFA World Championship in Italy, scoring his only goal in the tournament in the final against Spain (1–0). In 1993 he was again essential as the under-20s reached the final, losing to Brazil.

A full international since the age of 18, Duah represented the nation at the 1996 Summer Olympics and the 2002 Africa Cup of Nations, exiting in the quarterfinals in the former competition.

Honours

Club
Torino
Coppa Italia: 1992–93

União de Leiria
Segunda Liga: 1997–98

Nejmeh
Lebanese Premier League: 2004–05
Lebanese Elite Cup: 2004–05

International
Ghana U17
FIFA U-17 World Championship: 1991

Ghana U20
FIFA World Youth Championship: Runner-up 1993

References

External links

1976 births
Living people
Footballers from Kumasi
Ghanaian footballers
Association football wingers
Segunda División players
Liga Leumit players
Lebanese Premier League players
Torino F.C. players
Belgian Pro League players
Standard Liège players
Süper Lig players
Adana Demirspor footballers
Eskişehirspor footballers
RCD Mallorca players
Primeira Liga players
Liga Portugal 2 players
U.D. Leiria players
Gil Vicente F.C. players
A.D. Ovarense players
Nejmeh SC players
Hapoel Acre F.C. players
Ghana under-20 international footballers
Ghana international footballers
2002 African Cup of Nations players
Footballers at the 1996 Summer Olympics
Olympic footballers of Ghana
Ghanaian expatriate footballers
Expatriate footballers in Italy
Expatriate footballers in Belgium
Expatriate footballers in Turkey
Expatriate footballers in Spain
Expatriate footballers in Portugal
Expatriate footballers in Lebanon
Expatriate footballers in Israel
Ghanaian expatriate sportspeople in Turkey
Ghanaian expatriate sportspeople in Portugal
Ghanaian expatriate sportspeople in Lebanon